Koksan may refer to:

 Koksan County, a county in North Hwanghae Province, North Korea
 Koksan Airport, an airport in Koksan County
 Koksan (artillery), a North Korean self-propelled gun